Alec Mudimu (born 8 April 1995) is a Zimbabwean footballer who plays as a midfielder for Cymru Premier club Caernarfon Town and the Zimbabwe national team.

Early and personal life
Mudimu was born in Harare, Zimbabwe, and moved to England at the age of five or six, living in Hertfordshire and London.

Club career
Mudimu played youth football for Sheffield Wednesday and Stalybridge Celtic, joining the latter club in 2011. He made his senior debut in the 2012–13 season. He moved on loan to Radcliffe Borough in January 2015.

He later played for Northwich Victoria and Stockport Town before joining Welsh Premier League side Cefn Druids in July 2017. He made his league debut for the club on 8 September 2017 in a 4–0 away defeat to TNS. He scored his first league goal for the club on 30 September 2017 in a 2–1 away victory over Llandudno, scoring in the 18th minute. He went on trial with English Football League club Fleetwood Town in December 2017. He also spent time on trial with Rochdale.

On 11 December 2019, Moldovan club Sheriff Tiraspol announced the signing of Mudimu from 20 January 2020.

In January 2021 he signed for Turkish club Ankaraspor.

After spending time in Georgia with FC Torpedo Kutaisi, he returned to England in February 2022 to sign for Altrincham. On 27 February 2022, Mudimu left Altrincham after making just two league appearances for the club.

On 23 August 2022, Saburtalo Tbilisi announced the signing of Mudimu.

International career
Mudimu was called up by the Zimbabwe national team for the first time in March 2018. He made his debut in the semi-final of the 2018 Four Nations Tournament, during a penalty shootout defeat against hosts Zambia on 21 March 2018.

Mudimu was later called up to Zimbabwe's squad for the 2018 COSAFA Cup. Zimbabwe went on to win the tournament, beating Zambia in the final.

In October 2018, he was selected as part of Zimbabwe's squad for Africa Cup of Nations qualifiers.

References

1995 births
Living people
Zimbabwean footballers
Association football midfielders
Zimbabwe international footballers
2019 Africa Cup of Nations players
2021 Africa Cup of Nations players
Sheffield Wednesday F.C. players
Stalybridge Celtic F.C. players
Radcliffe F.C. players
Northwich Victoria F.C. players
Stockport Town F.C. players
Cefn Druids A.F.C. players
FC Sheriff Tiraspol players
Ankaraspor footballers
FC Torpedo Kutaisi players
Altrincham F.C. players
National League (English football) players
Cymru Premier players
Moldovan Super Liga players
TFF First League players
Erovnuli Liga players
Zimbabwean expatriate footballers
Zimbabwean expatriate sportspeople in England
Expatriate footballers in England
Zimbabwean expatriate sportspeople in Wales
Expatriate footballers in Wales
Zimbabwean expatriate sportspeople in Moldova
Expatriate footballers in Moldova
Zimbabwean expatriate sportspeople in Turkey
Expatriate footballers in Turkey
Zimbabwean expatriate sportspeople in Georgia (country)
Expatriate footballers in Georgia (country)
FC Saburtalo Tbilisi players
Caernarfon Town F.C. players